Swords Against Tomorrow is an anthology of fantasy stories, edited by Robert Hoskins. It was first published in paperback by Signet Books in August 1970.

Summary
The book collects five sword and sorcery or sword and planet short stories and novelettes by various authors, together with an introduction and introductory notes to the individual stories by the editor.

All of the authors represented except Leigh Brackett were members of the Swordsmen and Sorcerers' Guild of America (SAGA), a somewhat informal literary group of fantasy authors active from the 1960s to the 1980s, making the book a precursor of the five Flashing Swords! anthologies of SAGA-member works edited by Lin Carter from 1973 to 1981.

Contents
"Introduction" (Robert Hoskins)
"Demon Journey" (Poul Anderson) (from Planet Stories v. 4, no. 10, January 1951)
"Bazaar of the Bizarre" (Fafhrd and the Gray Mouser) (Fritz Leiber) (from Fantastic Stories of the Imagination v. 12, no. 8, August 1963)
"Vault of Silence" (Kellory the Warlock) (Lin Carter) (first publication)
"Devils in the Walls" (Brak the Barbarian) (John Jakes) (from Fantastic Stories of the Imagination v. 12, no. 5, May 1963)
"Citadel of Lost Ships" (Leigh Brackett) (from Planet Stories v. 2, no. 2, March 1943)

Reception
Alan Brown, writing of the anthology on tor.com, calls it "a quirky little collection, but turned out to be precisely what I was looking for: a group of well-told tales that were perfect for reading on a sunny summer afternoon. They were all enjoyable, with the standout being the Brackett tale." He observes that it "offers work from five excellent authors at the top of their game, and each story, in a slightly different way, delivered the excitement, action, and adventure I crave from this type of fiction." Turning to the individual stories, he notes "Anderson’s skill is apparent, and he delivers a taut little action-packed tale," while the Leiber contribution, a Fafhrd and the Gray Mouser tale, is, "[l]ike all their adventures, ... a delight. ... I enjoyed the action, the irony, and magic when I was young, but now find that the story also serves as a cautionary tale about the dangers and futility of unfettered capitalism." The Carter piece, "[t]he anthology’s only original story, ... is pure sword and sorcery" whose "only flaw" is that it feels "more like a first chapter than a complete story." Brown finds the Brak story "serviceably constructed, and enjoyable enough, [though] I suspect many more will remember Jakes for his historical fiction than his tales of Brak." The final piece, on the other hand, "is an example of Leigh Brackett at her best. ... The story is not only a great adventure tale, it is a story of redemption, and an indictment of colonialism and oppression ... Brackett is a master of packing remarkable amounts of worldbuilding into a story without ever burdening it with too much exposition, and the tale barrels along from beginning to end without a break in the action. This story alone was well worth the book’s price of admission."

The book was also reviewed by L. Sprague de Camp in Amra v. 2, no. 54, April 1971, p. 15.

Notes

1970 short story collections
Fantasy anthologies
Signet Books books